Rebecca Peterson was the defending champion, but chose not to participate.

Christina McHale won the title, defeating Stefanie Vögele in the final, 7–6(7–4), 6–2.

Seeds

Draw

Finals

Top half

Bottom half

References

Main Draw

Open de Cagnes-sur-Mer - Singles